This article includes the 2015 ITF Men's Circuit tournaments which occurred between January and March 2015.

Point Distribution

Key

Month

January

February

March

References

External links
International Tennis Federation official website

2015 ITF Men's Circuit